Footlights and Shadows may refer to:
 Hitch Hike to Heaven, also known as Footlights and Shadows,  a 1936 American drama film
 Footlights and Shadows (1920 film), an American silent drama film